Tusmore  may refer to:

 Tusmore, South Australia
 Tusmore, Oxfordshire